Olaniyi Rasheed Akindiya, also known as Akirash, is an artist from Lagos, Nigeria.

Early life and education 
He studied art at the Institute of Textile Technology, Arts, and Design in Oregun, Lagos State.

Career 
He founded the nonprofit ARTWITHAKIRASH in 2000, which invites the community to participate in his performance art.

He moved to Austin, Texas, in 2011. One example of his public performance art is his 2013 walk from CentralTrak to the Magnolia Hotel in Dallas wearing tape and water bottles. When he arrived at the Pegasus Plaza at the Magnolia Hotel: "[h]e was walking around a massive canvas covered in strips and piles of cloth and surrounded by little Ziploc bags of paint. Akirash picked one up, twisted it into the shape of an icing bag and bit the corner off, then held it about penis-level and pretended to pee color onto the canvas, swaying back and forth like a boy pissing into a lake." He then invited the crowd to participate in painting.

In 2018 Akirash installed a piece called "Masquerades Mythologies" at the Lawndale Art Center.

External links 
 Official Website:
 Vimeo

References 

Year of birth missing (living people)
Living people
Artists from Lagos